Paraburkholderia bryophila is a Gram-negative, catalase- and oxidase-positive, non-spore-forming, and nonmotile bacterium of the genus Paraburkholderia and the family Burkholderiaceae. Research has shown that P. bryophila demonstrates anti-fungal activity against phytopathogens and the growth of plant-associated properties.

References

bryophila
Bacteria described in 2007